S-7 was a Stalinets-class submarine of the Soviet Navy. Her keel was laid down by Krasnoye Sormovo in Gorkiy on 14 December 1936. She was launched on 5 April 1937 and commissioned on 30 June 1940 in the Baltic Fleet. During World War II, the submarine was under the command of Captain Sergei Prokofievich Lisin and took part in the Soviet submarine Baltic Sea campaign in 1942. S-7 scored victories, but was sunk in action.

Service history 
The submarine made all her victories in summer 1942, having some success against the German-Swedish iron ore shipping lines (the main target of 1942 Soviet submarine campaign).

On 27 July 1942 S-7 also attacked the German merchant Ellen Larsen (1,938 GRT): the torpedoes missed and S-7 opened fire with her gun. As result the merchant was driven ashore.

Loss 

Four crewmembers were saved and captured, including the commander Lisin. Commander Lisin was believed killed in action and was awarded post-mortem the distinction, Hero of the Soviet Union. Once Finland signed an armistice with the Allies in 1944, Lisin was freed and was sent by the Soviets to an NKVD special camp. However accusations against him were dropped (he kept the title of Hero) and became a military instructor at an officer school.

Discovery of wreck 

In July 1998, the wreck of S-7 was found. The official data of war archives alleges that S-7 was torpedoed in Finnish waters, but the submarine was found in Swedish territorial waters – east of Söderarm in Stockholm's northern archipelago.

References 

1937 ships
Ships built in the Soviet Union
Soviet S-class submarines
World War II submarines of the Soviet Union
Maritime incidents in October 1942
Ships sunk by Finnish submarines
Shipwrecks in the Baltic Sea
Ships built by Krasnoye Sormovo Factory No. 112
Submarines sunk by submarines